Heroes is a role-playing game published by Tabletop Games (U.K.) in 1979.

Description
Heroes is set in Europe in the Dark Ages, oriented more toward campaigns than individual characters; the systems draw heavily on miniatures rules. It is a historic game without fantasy elements.

Publication history
Heroes was designed by Dave Millward and published by Tabletop Games in 1979 as an 80-page book. It has been republished in 2012 by ECW Role Play Games.

Reception

References

British role-playing games
Fantasy role-playing games
Role-playing games introduced in 1979